Arian Moayed (born April 15, 1980) is an Iranian-American actor, writer, and director. Moayed received a Tony Award nomination for Best Featured Actor in a Play for his performance in Bengal Tiger at the Baghdad Zooand a Primetime Emmy Award nomination for Outstanding Guest Actor in a Drama Series for his role as Stewy Hosseini in HBO's Succession.

Moayed has starred in the Broadway plays The Humans (2016), and A Doll's House (2023). He portrayed Todd Spodek in Netflix’s Inventing Anna, as well as his portrayal of Agent P. Cleary in the Marvel Cinematic Universe film Spider-Man: No Way Home and Disney+ series Ms. Marvel.

Early life
Moayed was born in Tehran, Iran. His father is a banker by profession. His parents emigrated from Iran in 1986. The family settled in Glenview, Illinois, a suburb of Chicago, when Moayed was five years old. He speaks Persian.

Moayed graduated from Glenbrook South High School in 1998. He then received a bachelor's degree from Indiana University in 2002. During college, he appeared in plays by Samuel Beckett, Carlo Goldoni and William Shakespeare.

Career
Moayed moved to Manhattan after college. In 2002, Moayed and director Tom Ridgely, who was Moayed's roommate at Indiana University, co-founded the Waterwell, a theater, education and film company based out of New York. Waterwell has produced more than a dozen stage productions and shows since the theater was established.

He portrayed the character of Musa in Rajiv Joseph's Bengal Tiger at the Baghdad Zoo, where Moayed appeared opposite Robin Williams. Moayed received a Tony Award nomination for Best Featured Actor in a Play for his portrayal of Musa at the 65th Tony Awards in 2011. He also received a Drama League Award nomination and received a Theater World Award.

As a writer/director, Moayed wrote and directed his first short Overdue, which premiered at the Cinequest Film Festival and was released on The Business of Being Born website. His second film, Day Ten, stars Omar Metwally and is about the days after September 11, 2001, premiering at the Tribeca Film Festival.

In 2016, he starred as Babur, one of two characters in Guards at the Taj, a play written by Rajiv Joseph, alongside Omar Metwally as Humayun. For his performance, he received a 2016 Obie Award presented by the American Theatre Wing and The Village Voice.

In 2017, Moayed starred as Richard Saad in Stephen Karam's The Humans, which performed at the Roundabout Theater off-Broadway, Helen Hayes Theater and  Gerald Schoenfeld Theater on Broadway as well as the Hampstead Theater in London, United Kingdom. The production was directed by Joe Mantello and produced by Scott Rudin and garnered Moayed a Drama Desk Award, Drama League Award and a Tony Award for Best Play.

Since 2018, Moayed has starred as Stewy Hosseini in HBO's Succession for which he received a nomination for a Primetime Emmy Award for Outstanding Guest Actor in a Drama Series in 2022.

Waterwell
Waterwell focuses on socially conscious and civic minded approach to theater, education, and film. Waterwell mission states, "empower its audience to change their lives and the world in which they live."

As the co-founder of Waterwell, Moayed has helped devise over a dozen original productions including most recently a dual-language Hamlet (played the title role) to critical acclaim. Also with Waterwell, Moayed produced a forgotten war musical called Blueprint Specials, produced on board of the Intrepid with a cast of veterans.

With Waterwell Films, he has written and directed the Emmy nominated and Webby nominated The Accidental Wolf, a premium short form series starring Kelli O'Hara, Laurie Metcalf, Denis O'Hare, Brandon Dirden, Ben McKenzie, Judith Ivey, Reed Birney, Marsha Stephanie Blake and a cast of over 70 Tony nominations on its own platform, theaccidentalwolf.com.

Personal life
He lives in New York City with his wife, Krissy Shields and two daughters.

Filmography

Film

Television

Theatre

Accolades

References

External links
 
 Waterwell

1980 births
Living people
American male stage actors
American theatre managers and producers
American male screenwriters
Indiana University alumni
People from Glenview, Illinois
Male actors from New York City
Iranian emigrants to the United States
American writers of Iranian descent
Male actors from Illinois
American male television actors
21st-century American male actors
21st-century Iranian male actors
American male film actors
Film directors from Illinois
Screenwriters from New York (state)
Screenwriters from Illinois
Iranian male television actors
Iranian screenwriters
Theatre World Award winners